Jon Ivar Christensen (20 March 1943 – 18 February 2020) was a Norwegian jazz drummer. He was married to actress, minister, and theater director Ellen Horn, and was the father of singer and actress Emilie Stoesen Christensen.

Career
In the late 1960s, Christensen played alongside Jan Garbarek on several recordings by the composer George Russell. He also was a central participant in the jazz band Masqualero, with Arild Andersen, and they reappeared in 2003 for his 60th anniversary. He appears on many recordings on the ECM label with such artists as Keith Jarrett, Jan Garbarek, Terje Rypdal, Bobo Stenson, Eberhard Weber, Ralph Towner, including the seminal 1975 Solstice, Barre Phillips, Arild Andersen, Enrico Rava, John Abercrombie, Michael Mantler, Miroslav Vitous, Rainer Brüninghaus, Charles Lloyd, Dino Saluzzi Jakob Bro, and Tomasz Stanko. Christensen was a member of the Keith Jarrett "European Quartet" of the 1970s, along with Jan Garbarek and Palle Danielsson, which produced five jazz recordings on ECM Records.

Jon Christensen died on 18 February 2020, at the age of 76.

Honors
 Jazznytt musician poll, 1967
 Buddyprisen, Norwegian Jazz Forum, 1967
 Drummer of the Year, European Jazz Federation, 1975
 Spellemannprisen, 1977
 Spellemannprisen, three times with Masqualero, 1983, 1986 and 1991

Discography (in selection)

As leader 
1976: No Time for Time (Pan)

As sideman 
With Yelena Eckemoff
2015: Everblue (L&H Production)
2020: Nocturnal Animals (L&H Production)

With George Russell
1967: The Essence of George Russell (Soul Note)
1969: Electronic Sonata for Souls Loved by Nature (Flying Dutchman)
1970: Trip to Prillarguri (Soul Note)
1971: Listen to the Silence (Soul Note)

With Lee Konitz, Pony Poindexter, Phil Woods and Leo Wright
1968: Alto Summit (MPS)

With Steve Kuhn
1968: Watch What Happens! (MPS)

With Jan Garbarek
1969: Esoteric Circle (Flying Dutchman)
1970: Afric Pepperbird (ECM)
1971: Sart (ECM)
1973: Witchi-Tai-To (ECM)
1975: Dansere (ECM)
1975: Ingentings Bjeller (Polydor)
1978: Photo with Blue Sky, White Cloud, Wires, Windows and a Red Roof (ECM)
1980: Paths, Prints (ECM)

With Jakob Bro
2015: Gefion (ECM)
2018: Returnings (ECM)

With Bobo Stenson
1971: Underwear (ECM)
1996: Reflections (ECM)
1997: War Orphans (ECM)
1999: Serenity (ECM)

With Terje Rypdal
1971: Terje Rypdal (ECM)
1973: What Comes After (ECM)
1974: Whenever I Seem to Be Far Away (ECM)
1995: Skywards (ECM)
2003: Vossabrygg (ECM)

With Ketil Bjørnstad
1973: Åpning (Philips)
1990: The Shadow (Kirkelig Kulturverksted)
1993: Water Stories (ECM)
1994: The Sea (ECM)
1996: The Sea II (ECM)
2009: Remembrance (ECM)

With Keith Jarrett
1974: Belonging (ECM)
1977: My Song (ECM)
1979: Personal Mountains (ECM)
1979: Nude Ants (ECM)
1979: Sleeper (ECM)

With Ralph Towner
1974: Solstice (ECM)
1977: Solstice/Sound and Shadows (ECM)
1995: Lost and Found (ECM)

With Karin Krog, Steve Kuhn and Steve Swallow
1975: We Could Be Flying (Polydor, 1975)

With Eberhard Weber
1975: Yellow Fields (ECM, 1975)

With Enrico Rava
1975: The Pilgrim and the Stars (ECM, 1975)
1976: The Plot (ECM, 1976)

With Radka Toneff Quintet
1977: Winter Poem (Zarepta)

With Terje Rypdal and Palle Mikkelborg
1977: Waves (ECM)
1979: Descendre (ECM)

With Masqualero (Arild Andersen)
1983: Masqualero (Odin)
1986: Bande a Part (ECM)
1988: Aero (ECM)
1989: Re-Enter (ECM)

With Blow Out
1977: Blow Out (Compendium)

With Miroslav Vitous
1979: First Meeting (ECM)
1980: Miroslav Vitous Group (ECM)
1982: Journey's End (ECM)

With Rainer Brüninghaus
1980: Freigeweht (ECM)

With Mike Nock
1981: Ondas (ECM)

With John Clark, David Friedman and David Darling 
1981: Faces (ECM)

With Harry Pepl and Herbert Joos
1988: Cracked Mirrors (ECM)

With Lillebjørn Nilsen, Arild Andersen, Eivind Aarset, Jan Erik Kongshaug
1988: Sanger (Grappa)

With John Abercrombie
1989: Animato (ECM)

With Charles Lloyd
1989: Fish Out of Water (ECM)

With L. Shankar
1989: M.R.C.S. (ECM)

With Sidsel Endresen
1990: So I Write (ECM)

With Knut Riisnæs
1992: Knut Riisnæs - Jon Christensen Featuring John Scofield - Palle Danielsson (Odin)

With Anouar Brahem
1994: Khomsa (ECM)

With Misha Alperin
1996: North Story (ECM)

With Lars Danielsson, David Liebman and Bobo Stenson 
1997: Live at Visiones (Dragon)

With Tomasz Stańko
1997: Litania: Music of Krzysztof Komeda (ECM)
1998: From the Green Hill (ECM)

With Dino Saluzzi
2002: Senderos (ECM)

With Jacob Young
Evening Falls (ECM, 2004)
Sideways (ECM, 2008)

With Carsten Dahl and Arild Andersen 
2006: Short Fairytales (EmArcy)
2012: Space Is the Place (Storyville)

With Carl Petter Opsahl and Tord Gustavsen
2008: Love, the Blues (Park Grammofon)

With Ingebrigt Håker Flaten and Håkon Kornstad 
2011: Mitt Hjerte Altid Vanker – I Live at Oslo Jazzfestival (Compunctio)
2011: Mitt Hjerte Altid Vanker – II Live at Uppsala Sacred Music Festival (Compunctio)

References

External links
Jon Christensen Biography DrummerWorld.com
 

1943 births
2020 deaths
Musicians from Oslo
Avant-garde jazz musicians
ECM Records artists
20th-century Norwegian drummers
21st-century Norwegian drummers
Norwegian jazz drummers
Male drummers
Spellemannprisen winners
20th-century drummers
20th-century Norwegian male musicians
21st-century Norwegian male musicians
Male jazz musicians
1300 Oslo members
Petter Wettre Quartet members
Jacob Young Group members
Jazzpunkensemblet members
Masqualero members